Gabriel Popescu (October 24, 1971 — June 16, 2022) was a Romanian-American optical engineer, who was the William L. Everitt Distinguished Professor in Electrical and Computer Engineering at University of Illinois Urbana-Champaign. He was best known for his work on biomedical optics and quantitative phase-contrast microscopy.

Biography
Popescu was born on October 24, 1971, in Romania. He obtained bachelor's and master's degrees in physics from the University of Bucharest in 1995 and 1996, respectively. He further obtained obtained a master's degree and a PhD in optics, in 1999 and 2002, respectively, from School of Optics at University of Central Florida. In 2002, he joined Massachusetts Institute of Technology as a postdoctoral researcher under the supervision of Michael Stephen Feld.

In 2007, Popescu joined the University of Illinois Urbana-Champaign as an assistant professor and established the Quantitative Light Imaging (QLI) Laboratory. At this institution, he was affiliated with the Electrical and Computer Engineering and Bioengineering departments, as well as with the Beckman Institute for Advanced Science and Technology. In 2009, he obtained American citizenship.

Popescu was an associate editor for Optics Express and Biomedical Optics Express and served as an editorial board member for Journal of Biomedical Optics and Scientific Reports. He was a Fellow of Optica, SPIE and American Institute for Medical and Biological Engineering. He is the author of the textbook Quantitative Phase Imaging of Cells and Tissues and editor of Nanobiophotonics, which were released respectively in 2010 and 2011. He is also the founder of the startup company Phi Optics, which focuses on the commercialization of quantitative phase-contrast microscopy.

On June 16, 2022, Popescu died in his native village of Prundu, after suffering a fatal motorcycle accident. He was survived by his wife Catherine Best-Popescu, a research assistant professor at University of Illinois Urbana-Champaign, and two children.

Research
Popescu's research has focused on biomedical optics, optical microscopy and spectroscopy. He has been regarded as a pioneering figure in quantitative phase-contrast microscopy, which facilitates non-destructive and label-free imaging of biological samples. Respectively in 2006, 2010 and 2017, he introduced different extensions of this method: diffraction phase microscopy, spatial light interference microscopy and gradient light interference microscopy.

Selected publications
Books
 
 

Journal articles

References

External links
 

1971 births
2022 deaths
Romanian emigrants to the United States
Naturalized citizens of the United States
University of Illinois Urbana-Champaign faculty
University of Bucharest alumni
University of Central Florida alumni
Optical engineers
American biomedical engineers
21st-century American non-fiction writers
Romanian non-fiction writers
21st-century Romanian writers
Motorcycle road incident deaths
Road incident deaths in Romania
People from Giurgiu County
21st-century American engineers
Romanian engineers
21st-century American inventors
Romanian inventors
21st-century Romanian scientists
Romanian medical researchers
Romanian academics
American engineering writers
Engineers from Illinois
People from Urbana, Illinois
Fellows of SPIE
Fellows of Optica (society)
Fellows of the American Institute for Medical and Biological Engineering